Chongqing Normal University (Simplified Chinese: 重庆师范大学) is a major public research university in Chongqing, China. Founded in 1954 as East Sichuan Normal School, it is one of the institutions of higher learning in the People's Republic of China and the top normal university in Chongqing, China.

The university is composed of seventeen academic faculties that offer study in a wide range of academic disciplines for undergraduates and for graduates. Chongqing Normal University has three main campuses: the main campus University City Campus is located in Huxi Street, Chongqing High-tech Development Zone. In addition, Beibei Campus and Shapingba Campus are located in Beiquan Road, Beibei District and Tianchen Road, Shapingba District, Chongqing respectively. The Chongqing Normal University Library is the largest academic library system in Chongqing, holding about 20.4 million items, comprising 79 electrical book databases holding about 2.69 million items.

Chongqing Normal University is entitled by the Ministry of Education，P.R. China to recruit overseas students. It was designated as one of the first Chinese Language Educational Centres by the Overseas Chinese Affairs Office of the State Council, and it was awarded the National Teaching Base for International Promotion of Chinese (Chongqing) by Confucius Institute Headquarters in 2007.

The faculty of politics of Chongqing Normal University is one of the top political research institutions in China, and the dean of the faculty is concurrently served by Meng Dongfang, the president of Chongqing Normal University. At present, the faculty of  politics of Chongqing Normal University has many teaching and scientific research platforms, such as the innovation and development center of Ideological and political education of the Ministry of education of China, Chongqing Research Center for civic morality and social construction, Chongqing theoretical research center for socialism with Chinese characteristics, Chongqing Civil Affairs Policy theoretical research base, Chongqing Yan'an Spirit Research Association, etc.

The history of Chongqing Normal University can be traced back to the official East Sichuan Normal School founded in 1906. The first principal was Deng Ken, the younger brother of Deng Xiaoping, who served as Vice Mayor of Chongqing City and Vice Governor of Hubei Province. In 1960, Comrade Guo Moruo, then president of the Chinese Academy of Sciences, wrote the name of the school by himself. In 2003, Chongqing Normal University was officially renamed Chongqing Normal University approved by the Ministry of Education.

List of university faculties

Landscape

References

External links
 CNU website 
 International website



1954 establishments in China
Educational institutions established in 1954
Universities and colleges in Chongqing
Teachers colleges in China